Camilla Martha Horn (25 April 1903 – 14 August 1996) was a German dancer and a film star of the silent and sound era. She starred in several Hollywood films of the late 1920s and in a few British and Italian productions.

Biography

The daughter of a civil servant, Horn was educated as a dressmaker and worked at Erfurt. In 1925, together with Marlene Dietrich, she worked as an extra in the German film Madame Wants No Children, and later she was seen in a musical review by director Alexander Korda. She made her great breakthrough in 1926, when she replaced Lillian Gish as "Gretchen" in F. W. Murnau's UFA production of Faust.

In 1928 she sailed for Hollywood, where she played opposite John Barrymore in Tempest and Eternal Love. She returned to Europe, and in the 1930s refused to follow the official line of the Nazis and was prosecuted for a monetary offense. After the war the British tribunal at Delmenhorst convicted her for minor offenses (among them travelling without permission) and she was imprisoned for three months at the women's prison in Vechta.

From 1930 until her retirement in 1953, she remained a screen favorite in German, British, and Italian films, and late in life, she was invited to make her screen comeback, in the 1987's Schloss Konigswald.  She spent her old age at Herrsching, and died at Gilching near Starnberg, where she had lived during the last year of her life.

Between April 1972 and February 1973 a song was written about her by the then-unsigned Bruce Springsteen. This still-unreleased song surfaced in the 1990s on a bootleg, "Early Years".

Awards
1987 Bavarian Film Awards, Best Actress

Selected filmography

 Kean (1921)
 Ways to Strength and Beauty (1925) - (uncredited)
 Tartuffe (1925)
 Faust (1926) - Gretchen / Marguerite
 Madame Wants No Children (1926) - Dancer
 The Bordellos of Algiers (1927) - Adrienne Brisson
 Eva and the Grasshopper (1927) - Camille de Saxe
 The Merry Vineyard (1927) - Clärchen Gunderloch
 The Tempest (1928) - Princess Tamara
 Eternal Love (1929) - Ciglia
 Three Around Edith (1929) - Lady Edith Trent
 The Royal Box (1929) - Alice Doren
 You'll Be in My Heart (1930) - Diane D'Artois
 Fundvogel (1930) - Esther
 Morals at Midnight (1930) - Nelly Wendt
 The Great Longing (1930) - Eva von Loe
 Hans in Every Street (1930) - Elisabeth, seine Braut
 Sunday of Life (1931) - Ellen Hobart
 The Song of the Nations (1931)
 I Go Out and You Stay Here (1931) - Gaby, Mannequin
 Reckless Youth (1931) - Lydia Thorne
 The Night Without Pause (1931) - Letta Larbo
 The Five Accursed Gentlemen (1932) - Camilla
 The Cheeky Devil (1932) - Alice Ménard
 The Return of Raffles (1932) - Elga
 Moral und Liebe (1933) - Vera
 Rund um eine Million (1933) - Lilly
 The Rakoczi March (1933) - Vilma
 The Love Nest (1933) - Fifi
 Matinee Idol (1933) - Sonia Vance
 If I Were King (1934) - Inge Winkler
 The Double (1934) - Jenny Miller
 The Big Chance (1934) - Helga, seine Tochter
 The Luck of a Sailor (1934) - Louise
  (1934) - Fürstin Stefanie
 The Last Waltz (1934) - Vera, ihre Nichte
 Ich sehne mich nach dir (1934) - Ivonne Brandt
 The Red Rider (1935) - Hasia Nowrowska
 White Slaves (1937) - Manja - seine Tochter
 Sein letztes Modell (1937) - Maria Várady
 Crooks in Tails (1937) - Vera Dalmatoff
 Travelling People (1938) - Pepita
 Red Orchids (1938) - Baronin Ogolenska
 In geheimer Mission (1938) - Marion
 Roman eines Arztes (1939) - Käthe Üding - seine Frau
 Central Rio (1939) - Diane Mercier
 Polterabend (1940) - Lissi
 Herz ohne Heimat (1940) - Dina Horster
 Die letzte Runde (1940) - Lilly
  (1940) - Renée Lemonier
 Friedemann Bach (1941) - Mariella Fiorini
 Vertigine (1942) - Corinna Dellys, l'amante di Alberto
 Paura d'amare (1942) - Barberina / Zia Barbara
 Angelo del crepuscolo (1942) - Anna
 Seine beste Rolle (1944) - Elise Sander
 Intimitäten (1948) - Helene
 Search for Majora (1949) - Gritt Faller
 Queen of the Arena (1952) - Diana Bianca, Dompteuse
 Father Is Being Stupid (1953) - Baronin von Baran
 Appointment in Beirut (1969) - Mrs. Evelyn Brown
 Wer weint denn schon im Freudenhaus? (1970) - Paula
 Immer bei Vollmond (1970) - Wegelins Mutter
 Der Unsichtbare (1987) - Olga Benjamin
 Schloß Königswald (1988) - FürstinGroßmutter

References

External links

 
 
 Photographs and literature
 Brief biography

1903 births
1996 deaths
Actors from Frankfurt
German film actresses
German silent film actresses
20th-century German actresses